Dylan Riis Verrechia (born March 9, 1976 in Paris) is a Barthélemois award-winning film director, auteur, screenwriter, and producer. He grew up in Saint Barthélemy, French West Indies, and was bedridden at age 8 from severe ankylosing spondylitis for ten years. A graduate with honors of New York University's Tisch School of the Arts, Verrechia's movies have screened at film festivals around the world.

Tierra Madre (Part II of the Tijuana Trilogy) won in 2010 the Jury Award for Best Feature Film at the Reeling Chicago Lesbian and Gay International Film Festival , the  Jury Award for Special Mention Feature Film at the Festival Internacional de Cine de Morelia, the Diversity Award for Best Feature Film at the Barcelona International Gay and Lesbian Film Festival , the Outstanding Achievement in Foreign Feature Award at the Williamsburg International Film Festival , the Cinesul Award for Best Feature Film at the Cinesul Ibero-Americano Film Festival, the Golden Palm at the Mexico International Film Festival, the Honorary Mention Prize at the New Jersey Film Festival, and the Silver Lei for Excellence in Filmmaking at the Honolulu International Film Festival.

Kids of the Majestic won the Artivist Award for Best Feature in Children's Advocacy Category at the 2010 Artivist Film Festival & Awards, and the Directing and Writing Insight Awards of Recognition at the National Association of Film and Digital Media Artists .

Tijuana Makes Me Happy (Part I of the Tijuana Trilogy) won the Grand Jury Prize for Best Narrative Feature at the 2007 Slamdance Film Festival, and the Indie Max Award at the San Antonio Film Festival.

The Laughter of God won the World Tour Award for Best Actor and Best Cinematography at the 2003 IFCT Film Festival.

He is also the co-founder of Troopers Films (Arakimentari by Travis Klose, 2004 Brooklyn International Film Festival Winner), and 25th Frame (Picture Me by Sara Ziff, 2009 Milan International Film Festival Winner), and location scout on the Mexican border of Sangre de mi sangre by Christopher Zalla, 2007 Sundance Film Festival Winner). Verrechia is based in New York and in Baja California, and works as a director/writer, producer and director of photography on features, commercials and music videos. Credits include: Anthrax War by Bob Coen, Nortec Collective, DJ Vadim, Wu Tang Clan, Jean Rouch, Sam Pollard, The Weinstein Company, Morgan Spurlock, Todd Solondz, Andi Baiz, Pete Chatmon.

Awards

Special Mention for Best Mexican Feature Film at the Festival Internacional de Cine de Morelia,

Grand Jury Prize for Best Narrative Feature at the Slamdance Film Festival,

Black Lives Matter Award at Diversity in Cannes Film Showcase,

Jury Winner for Best Narrative at the BlackStar Film Festival,

Chicago Award for Best Film at the Chicago International Film Festival,

Jury Award for Best Feature Film at the Reeling: The Chicago LGBTQ+ International Film Festival ,

Artivist Film Festival & Awards for Best Feature Children's Advocacy ,

Diversity Award for Best Feature Film at the Barcelona International Gay and Lesbian Film Festival ,

Outstanding Achievement in Foreign Feature Award at the Williamsburg International Film Festival ,

Best International Feature at Out in the Desert Tucson's LGBT International Film Festival,

Cinesul Award for Best Feature Film at the Cinesul Ibero-Americano Film Festival,

Golden Palm at the Mexico International Film Festival,

Honorary Mention Prize at the New Jersey Film Festival,

Silver Lei for Excellence in Filmmaking at the Honolulu International Film Festival,

Directing and Writing Insight Awards of Recognition at the National Association of Film and Digital Media Artists ,

Audience Winner for Best Documentary at the Milan International Film Festival,
 
Audience Winner for Best Documentary at the Brooklyn International Film Festival,

Indie Max Award at the San Antonio Film Festival,

Gold Remi Prize at the WorldFest Houston Film Festival,

Filmmaking Award of Recognition at IMCED,

Runner Up Director at the International Festival of Cinema and Technology

Best Actor at the International Festival of Cinema and Technology

Best Cinematography at the International Festival of Cinema and Technology

References

External links

Tierra Madre at the Internet Movie Database
Kids of the Majestic at the Internet Movie Database
Tijuana Makes Me Happy at the Internet Movie Database
Verrechia's Production Company Official Website
PRWeb
Artivist Film Festival
Corre Camara
Los Angeles Times
 CNN Mexico
Morelia International Film Festival
Reeling Film Festival

American film directors
French film directors
Danish film directors
Mexican film directors
People from Saint Barthélemy
Film directors from New York City
1976 births
Living people
Tisch School of the Arts alumni